Ramsgate power station supplied electricity to the town of Ramsgate, Kent, England and the surrounding area from 1905 to 1958. The station was operated by the Ramsgate and District Electric Supply Company Limited until the nationalisation of the British electricity supply industry in 1948. The coal-fired power station had a maximum electricity generating capacity of 2 MW.

History
The Ramsgate and District Electric Supply Company Limited (incorporated in 1903) applied for a provisional order under the Electric Lighting Acts to generate and supply electricity to the town and local area. This was granted by the Board of Trade and was confirmed by Parliament through the Electric Lighting Orders Confirmation (No.3) Act 1904 (4 Edw. 7  c. clxxvi). The company built the Ramsgate power station (51°20'31"N 01°24'34"E) in Prince's Road, Ramsgate. This was adjacent to the corporation refuse destructor.

New plant was installed and the output of the power station was uprated to meet the increased demand for electricity.

In 1937 the County of London Electric Supply Company purchased the Ramsgate and District Electric Supply Company from Edmundsons Electricity Corporation Limited. The Ramsgate Company's capital was £150,000.

The British electricity supply industry was nationalised in 1948 under the provisions of the Electricity Act 1947 (10 & 11 Geo. 6 c. 54). The Ramsgate electricity undertaking was abolished, ownership of the power station was vested in the British Electricity Authority, and subsequently the Central Electricity Authority and the Central Electricity Generating Board (CEGB). At the same time the electricity distribution and sales responsibilities of the Ramsgate electricity undertaking were transferred to the South Eastern Electricity Board (SEEBOARD).

Ramsgate power station was closed and decommissioned on 1 April 1958 by the CEGB and was subsequently demolished. The site is occupied by an electricity sub-station.

Equipment specification

Plant in 1923
By 1923 the generating plant comprised:

 Coal-fired boilers generating up to 20,400 lb/h (2.57 kg/s) of steam which was supplied to:
 Generators:
 1 × 90 kW steam reciprocating engine direct current (DC)
 1 × 200 kW steam reciprocating engine DC
 1 × 300 kW steam reciprocating engine DC

These machines gave a total generating capacity of 590 kW DC.

Electricity supplies available to consumers were at 480 and 240 Volts DC.

Operations

Operating data 1921–23
The electricity supply data for the period 1921–23 was:

Electricity Loads on the system were:

Revenue from the sale of current (in 1923) was £19,649; the surplus of revenue over expenses was £10,048.

Operating data 1946
In 1946 Ramsgate power station supplied 1,659 MWh of electricity; the maximum output load was 2,148 kW.

Operating data 1954–58
Operating data for the period 1954–58 was:

See also
 Timeline of the UK electricity supply industry
 List of power stations in England
 Thanet power station 
 Richborough power station
 Isle of Thanet Electric Tramways and Lighting Company

References

Coal-fired power stations in England
Demolished power stations in the United Kingdom
Former power stations in England
Ramsgate